Prachi is an Indian feminine given name. Notable people and places with the name include:
Prachi Desai
Prachi Tehlan
Prachi Save Saathi
Prachi Garg
Prachi Mishra
Prachi Patankar
Prachi Thakker
Prachi Sinha
Prachi Deshpande
Prachi Vaishnav
Prachi River
Prachi, Gujarat